Mirko Petrov (born 1 November 1956) is a former Macedonian footballer.

Club career
After playing for Macedonian second tier clubs Rabotnički and Teteks, Mirko Petrov joined renowned Yugoslav First League team Hajduk Split. But, his two year stay in this team was marked with low number of caps. In his first season, he played one single match in national championship (against Velež Mostar) after which he was suspended for entire season because he wasn't properly registered for Hajduk. Also, during that season he played in UEFA Cup match against Valencia. Upon leaving Hajduk, he became important part of teams Pelister and Vardar. With latter one, he won Yugoslav Championship in 1987, before the title was given to FK Partizan after their 6 points deduction was reversed. He also set abroad to play season and a half for Spanish second tier side Real Burgos.

Personal life
His son is footballer Filip Petrov.

References

External links
 stats
 
 stats
 stats
 stats
 article

1956 births
Living people
Association football forwards
Yugoslav footballers
Macedonian footballers
FK Rabotnički players
FK Teteks players
HNK Hajduk Split players
FK Pelister players
FK Vardar players
Real Burgos CF footballers
Yugoslav Second League players
Yugoslav First League players
Segunda División players
Yugoslav expatriate footballers
Expatriate footballers in Spain
Yugoslav expatriate sportspeople in Spain